Matthew Gregory may refer to:

 Matthew Gregory (deacon) (1680–1777), member of the Connecticut House of Representatives from Norwalk
 Matthew Gregory (attorney) (born 1968), former Northern Mariana Islands Attorney General
 Matt Gregory (hiker) (born 1978)